Eugoa perfasciata is a moth of the family Erebidae first described by Walter Rothschild in 1913. It is found in Papua New Guinea.

References

perfasciata
Moths described in 1913